Octopolis and Octlantis are two separate non-human underwater settlements built by the gloomy octopuses. The first settlement, named Octopolis, was found in 2009. The individual structures in Octopolis are burrows, which additionally have scrap metal placed just around them. In 2016, a second settlement was found, named Octlantis, which instead of burrows, has dens and is built with seashells.

See also
Cephalopod intelligence

References

External links
Gallery of the Settlements

Octopuses
Populated places
Teuthology
Underwater